Anish Edward Paraam (born 19 July 1990) is a Singaporean cricketer who has made appearances for the Singapore national team in several major tournaments. Paraam has also played club cricket in England, including for Horwich in the Bolton League, and represented Durham MCC University in two first-class matches during the 2014 English season. He is one of three Singaporeans to have played first-class matches for an English university in recent years, the others being Oxford University's Sachin Mylavarapu and Durham MCCU's Abhiraj Singh.

In August 2018, he was named in Singapore's squad for the 2018 Asia Cup Qualifier tournament. He was the leading run-scorer for Singapore in the tournament, with 218 runs in five matches. In October 2018, he was named in Singapore's squad for the 2018 ICC World Cricket League Division Three tournament in Oman.

In July 2019, he was named in Singapore's Twenty20 International (T20I) squad for the Regional Finals of the 2018–19 ICC T20 World Cup Asia Qualifier tournament. He made his T20I debut for Singapore against Qatar on 22 July 2019.

In September 2019, he was named in Singapore's squad for the 2019 Malaysia Cricket World Cup Challenge League A tournament. In July 2022, he was named in Singapore's squad for the 2022 Canada Cricket World Cup Challenge League A tournament. He made his List A debut on 28 July 2022, for Singapore against Qatar.

References

External links
 

1990 births
Living people
Singaporean cricketers
Singapore Twenty20 International cricketers
Place of birth missing (living people)
Durham MCCU cricketers
Southeast Asian Games gold medalists for Singapore
Southeast Asian Games silver medalists for Singapore
Southeast Asian Games medalists in cricket
Competitors at the 2017 Southeast Asian Games